Bianyifang (Chinese: 便宜坊; pinyin: Biànyífānɡ) is a restaurant in Beijing, China. Famous for its specialty called peking duck, Bianyifang was founded more than 600 years ago during the Ming Dynasty. Today it has expanded to include several branches and is one of the 10 restaurant brands in China. It is one of the most popular restaurants in China and has been reported upon by a range of media outlets. The service philosophy of this restaurant is "Convenient and Comfortable."

Established in 1416, the 14th year of the Ming Yongle Emperor, the original Bianyifang used to be a small workshop, which produced duck and chicken food in Mishihutong (米市胡同), Caishikou, Beijing. In 1827, its owner Sun Zijiu (孙子久) began to extend its business and established a bigger restaurant, where Peking Duck and Spanish and French-style Duck Liver (西法鸭肝) became its "signature dishes." Due to the fame of the original Bianyifang, many restaurants named themselves "Bianyifang." The Xianyukou Bianyifang (鲜鱼口便宜坊) is the one that exists today, and was founded in 1855. It was established in Qianmen, Beijing, by a Wang family who hired a chef of the original Bianyifang. The restaurant has carried the Beijing cuisine tradition from the Qing dynasty to its modern-day form. Bianyifang's main competition has been Quanjude, another restaurant specializing in a different type of Peking Duck.

History and Name 
The history of the restaurant begins in the Ming Dynasty, Bianyifang was only a small pub on the street. Although the fame of the pub at that time was not famous far away, many customers had regarded Bianyifang as their favorite pub. The owner of Bianyifang was hospitable and treated every customer as his friends. There were many moving stories in this tavern. The boss would sit beside the guests and chatted with them, listening to their stories, and give them advice. Soon, more and more customers liked to come to Bianyifang.

The name of Bianyifang was created in 1552 by Yang Jisheng. Yang was a vice minister of the Ministry of War, who lived in Dazhi bridge outside Xuanwu Gate. He was falsely reported to have committed crimes authorities by Yan Song, the treacherous Prime Minister. According to the story, he was despondent and hungry and came to Caishikou Mishi alley (菜市口米市胡同). All of a sudden, he smelt a fragrance and came closer to see a small pub. When he entered the tavern, he found that although it was not big, it was quiet and elegant, and the guests were full. So he sat down and ordered roast duck and some wine and vegetables. He had a good meal and left all his troubles behind. Some guests recognized him and knew he was a famous patriotic minister, so they told the shopkeeper. The shopkeeper personally served him with duck and wine. Yang Jisheng learned that this tavern was called Bianyifang, and he saw that it was very hospitable, so he exclaimed, "this tavern is convenient and pleasant, and the price is fair as well!" He shouted, "Pass me a pen!" Yang Jisheng wrote three characters, "Bian Yi Fang (便宜坊)." The guests all clapped and smiled. Since then, Yang Jisheng and his ministers often visited the tavern. After that, he was arrested and killed by Yan Song. Yan Song asked the owner of Bianyifang to take off the plaque, but the owner refused. Yan Song then sent someone to remove the plaque. The boss tried hard to protect the plaque. He was beaten until he vomited and Yan Song eventually gave up. Today the name of Bianyifang means fair price and considerate service to the guests.

One significant character related to Bianyifang was Yang Jisheng, a vice minister of the Ministry of War (now the Ministry of National Defense) in the Ming Dynasty. He was always loyal to the emperor. He worked hard to serve people. He enjoyed a good reputation among the folks. He was so blunt that he reported a serious crime to the emperor despite of his own life. Unfortunately, Yang was framed by a treacherous Prime Minister called Yan Song. Yang was sent to the jail. Yang was so brave and persistent that he would never give in. Even when he got scars all over him, he tried to bear the huge pain of ridding the rotted parts on his body. He was deeply honored by the folks. The guests often came up with Yang when they visited Bianyifang.

Many customers tend to mistake the pronunciation of Bianyifang. The correct pronunciation should be "Biàn Yí Fāng", which means good service and pleasure.

Branches 
At present, Bianyifang has eight branch restaurants in Beijing, the capital of China: Hademen Branch, Yutingqiao Branch, Xingfu Street Branch, Anhua Branch, Hangtian Branch, New World Center Branch, Jianxiang Branch, Fufenglu Restaurant and Xianyukou Branch. Outside Beijing, there are three branches: Sanmenxia Branch in Henan Province, Hohhot Branch in Inner Mongolia, and Tangdu Branch in Shanxi Province.

Peking Duck 

Peking duck, known as Peking roast duck or "Beijing roast duck", is taken as an outstanding representative of Chinese cuisine and enjoys a high reputation in China and the world. Peking Duck originates from the Northern and Southern Dynasties of China, and its long history gives this dish a unique background. At that time, Peking duck was a dish for the court, and the ingredients used were the best. Peking duck has a beautiful color and looks very appetizing. It is delicious but not greasy and has a long aftertaste.
Today, Peking duck is found in every city in China. Many tourists come to Beijing for the sake of tasting the best Peking duck. Many foreign tourists also came to Beijing to experience the most special Chinese taste. The taste of this dish is unique, but the process of making it is quite complicated. The cooks must strictly follow a certain production process to make delicious Peking duck. There are three main restaurants in China that focus on Peking duck, including Dadong, Quanjude as well as Bianyifang. Peking duck has attracted customers deeply with its unique flavor and special historical background.

The Peking duck in Bianyifang is rather different from that from others. For instance, Quanjude employs an open-oven to cook Peking duck, whereas Bianyifang uses a closed one, which makes the skin of the duck crispier and more succulent. Peking duck has a certain way of eating. To taste the perfect taste of Peking duck, it is suggested to add some condiments, and then follow certain steps.

Although most famous for its traditional forms of Peking duck, Bianyifang continues to innovate and try new ways of preparing the dish. In 2008, Bianyifang created a new type called Olympic duck, which made it more convenient as it didn't require extra condiments and was more portable.

See also 

 Chinese cuisine
 Peking Duck
 Quanjude
 Dadong Roast Duck Restaurant

References

External links
 Homepage

Dongcheng District, Beijing
Restaurants in Beijing
1416 establishments in Asia
15th-century establishments in China
1855 establishments in China
Chinese restaurants
Chinese brands